Hilldale is an unincorporated community in Howard County, in the U.S. state of Missouri.

History
A post office called Hilldale was established in 1894, and remained in operation until 1910. The community was so named on account of hill and dale near the original town site.

References

Unincorporated communities in Howard County, Missouri
Unincorporated communities in Missouri